The 1964 United States House of Representatives elections was an election for the United States House of Representatives on November 3, 1964, to elect members to serve in the 89th United States Congress. They coincided with the election to a full term of President Lyndon B. Johnson. Johnson's landslide victory over Barry Goldwater allowed his Democratic Party to gain a net of 36 seats from the Republican Party, giving them a two-thirds majority in the House. The election also marked the first time since Reconstruction that Republicans made inroads in the deep South.

Disappointment over the results caused House Republicans to replace Minority Leader Charles Halleck with future President Gerald R. Ford.

Overall results

Summary of the November 3, 1964, election results

Southern significance
While the GOP performed badly nationally, Goldwater's tremendous success in the Deep South led to the election of several Republicans to the House from those states, many of them the first Republicans elected there since Reconstruction. These "Goldwater Republicans" were elected:
 Arthur Glenn Andrews (AL-4)
 John Hall Buchanan, Jr. (AL-6)
 Bo Callaway (GA-3)
 William Louis Dickinson (AL-2)
 Jack Edwards (AL-1)
 James D. Martin (AL-7)
 Prentiss Walker (MS-4)
 Albert Watson (SC-2)

Special elections 

|-
| 
| John F. Shelley
|  | Democratic
| 1949 (Special)
|  | Incumbent resigned January 7, 1964, to become Mayor of San Francisco.New member elected February 18, 1964.Democratic hold.Winner was subsequently re-elected in November.
| nowrap | 

|-
| 
| Howard Baker Sr.
|  | Republican
| 1950
|  | Incumbent died January 7, 1964.New member elected March 10, 1964 to finish her husband's term.Republican hold.Winner did not run for re-election in November.
| nowrap | 

|-
| 
| William J. Green Jr.
|  | Democratic
| 1944
|  | Incumbent died December 21, 1963.New member elected April 28, 1964 to finish his father's term.Democratic hold.Winner was subsequently re-elected in November.
| nowrap | 

|-
| 
| Clarence Cannon
|  | Democratic
| 1922
|  | Incumbent died May 12, 1964.New member elected November 3, 1964.Democratic hold.Winner also elected to the next term, see below.
| nowrap | 

|-
| 
| A. Walter Norblad
|  | Republican
| 1946 (Special)
|  | Incumbent died September 20, 1964.New member elected November 3, 1964.Republican hold.Winner also elected to the next term, see below.
| nowrap | 

|-
| 
| Robert W. Hemphill
|  | Democratic
| 1956
|  | Incumbent resigned May 1, 1964.New member elected November 3, 1964.Democratic hold.Winner also elected to the next term, see below.
| nowrap | 

|}

Alabama 

Alabama, which had not agreed on a redistricting plan until 1964 and had elected all members at-large in 1962, went back to electing from districts. While most of the at-large representatives were former district representatives and were thus geographically diverse, the 1st district near Mobile lacked an incumbent, and neither of the incumbents who lived in the 7th district were nominated.

|-
| 
| colspan=3  | None (District created)
|  | New seat.New member elected.Republican gain.
| nowrap | 

|-
| 
| George M. Grant
|  | Democratic
| 1938
|  | Incumbent lost re-election.New member elected.Republican gain.
| nowrap | 

|-
| 
| George W. Andrews
|  | Democratic
| 1944
| Incumbent re-elected.
| nowrap | 

|-
| 
| Kenneth A. Roberts
|  | Democratic
| 1950
|  | Incumbent lost re-election.New member elected.Republican gain.
| nowrap | 

|-
| 
| Armistead I. Selden Jr.
|  | Democratic
| 1952
| Incumbent re-elected.
| nowrap | 

|-
| 
| George Huddleston Jr.
|  | Democratic
| 1954
|  | Incumbent lost re-election.New member elected.Republican gain.
| nowrap | 

|-
| rowspan=2  | 
| Albert Rains
|  | Democratic
| 1944
|  | Incumbent retired.New member elected.Republican gain.
| rowspan=2 nowrap | 

|-
| Carl Elliott
|  | Democratic
| 1948
|  | Incumbent lost renomination.Democratic loss.

|-
| 
| Robert E. Jones Jr.
|  | Democratic
| 1947 
| Incumbent re-elected.
| nowrap | 

|}

Alaska 

|-
| 
| Ralph Julian Rivers
|  | Democratic
| 1958
| Incumbent re-elected.
| nowrap | 

|}

Arizona 

|-
| 
| John Jacob Rhodes
|  | Republican
| 1952
| Incumbent re-elected.
| nowrap | 

|-
| 
| Mo Udall
|  | Democratic
| 1961 (Special)
| Incumbent re-elected.
| nowrap | 

|-
| 
| George F. Senner Jr.
|  | Democratic
| 1962
| Incumbent re-elected.
| nowrap | 

|}

Arkansas 

|-
| 
| Ezekiel C. Gathings
|  | Democratic
| 1938
| Incumbent re-elected.
| nowrap | 

|-
| 
| Wilbur Mills
|  | Democratic
| 1938
| Incumbent re-elected.
| nowrap | 

|-
| 
| James William Trimble
|  | Democratic
| 1944
| Incumbent re-elected.
| nowrap | 

|-
| 
| Oren Harris
|  | Democratic
| 1940
| Incumbent re-elected.
| nowrap | 

|}

California 

|-
| 
| Donald H. Clausen
|  | Republican
| 1963
| Incumbent re-elected.
| nowrap | 

|-
| 
| Harold T. Johnson
|  | Democratic
| 1958
| Incumbent re-elected.
| nowrap | 

|-
| 
| John E. Moss
|  | Democratic
| 1952
| Incumbent re-elected.
| nowrap | 

|-
| 
| Robert L. Leggett
|  | Democratic
| 1962
| Incumbent re-elected.
| nowrap | 

|-
| 
| Phillip Burton
|  | Democratic
| 1964 
| Incumbent re-elected.
| nowrap | 

|-
| 
| William S. Mailliard
|  | Republican
| 1952
| Incumbent re-elected.
| nowrap | 

|-
| 
| Jeffery Cohelan
|  | Democratic
| 1958
| Incumbent re-elected.
| nowrap | 

|-
| 
| George P. Miller
|  | Democratic
| 1944
| Incumbent re-elected.
| nowrap | 

|-
| 
| Don Edwards
|  | Democratic
| 1962
| Incumbent re-elected.
| nowrap | 

|-
| 
| Charles S. Gubser
|  | Republican
| 1952
| Incumbent re-elected.
| nowrap | 

|-
| 
| J. Arthur Younger
|  | Republican
| 1952
| Incumbent re-elected.
| nowrap | 

|-
| 
| Burt L. Talcott
|  | Republican
| 1962
| Incumbent re-elected.
| nowrap | 

|-
| 
| Charles M. Teague
|  | Republican
| 1954
| Incumbent re-elected.
| nowrap | 

|-
| 
| John F. Baldwin Jr.
|  | Republican
| 1954
| Incumbent re-elected.
| nowrap | 

|-
| 
| John J. McFall
|  | Democratic
| 1956
| Incumbent re-elected.
| nowrap | 

|-
| 
| B. F. Sisk
|  | Democratic
| 1954
| Incumbent re-elected.
| nowrap | 

|-
| 
| Cecil R. King
|  | Democratic
| 1942
| Incumbent re-elected.
| nowrap | 

|-
| 
| Harlan Hagen
|  | Democratic
| 1952
| Incumbent re-elected.
| nowrap | 

|-
| 
| Chet Holifield
|  | Democratic
| 1942
| Incumbent re-elected.
| nowrap | 

|-
| 
| H. Allen Smith
|  | Republican
| 1956
| Incumbent re-elected.
| nowrap | 

|-
| 
| Augustus Hawkins
|  | Democratic
| 1962
| Incumbent re-elected.
| nowrap | 

|-
| 
| James C. Corman
|  | Democratic
| 1960
| Incumbent re-elected.
| nowrap | 

|-
| 
| Del M. Clawson
|  | Republican
| 1963
| Incumbent re-elected.
| nowrap | 

|-
| 
| Glenard P. Lipscomb
|  | Republican
| 1953
| Incumbent re-elected.
| nowrap | 

|-
| 
| Ronald B. Cameron
|  | Democratic
| 1962
| Incumbent re-elected.
| nowrap | 

|-
| 
| James Roosevelt
|  | Democratic
| 1954
| Incumbent re-elected.
| nowrap | 

|-
| 
| Everett G. Burkhalter
|  | Democratic
| 1962
|  | Incumbent retired.New member elected.Republican gain.
| nowrap | 

|-
| 
| Alphonzo E. Bell Jr.
|  | Republican
| 1960
| Incumbent re-elected.
| nowrap | 

|-
| 
| George Brown Jr.
|  | Democratic
| 1962
| Incumbent re-elected.
| nowrap | 

|-
| 
| Edward R. Roybal
|  | Democratic
| 1962
| Incumbent re-elected.
| nowrap | 

|-
| 
| Charles H. Wilson
|  | Democratic
| 1962
| Incumbent re-elected.
| nowrap | 

|-
| 
| Craig Hosmer
|  | Republican
| 1952
| Incumbent re-elected.
| nowrap | 

|-
| 
| Harry R. Sheppard
|  | Democratic
| 1936
|  | Incumbent retired.New member elected.Democratic hold.
| nowrap | 

|-
| 
| Richard T. Hanna
|  | Democratic
| 1962
| Incumbent re-elected.
| nowrap | 

|-
| 
| James B. Utt
|  | Republican
| 1952
| Incumbent re-elected.
| nowrap | 

|-
| 
| Bob Wilson
|  | Republican
| 1952
| Incumbent re-elected.
| nowrap | 

|-
| 
| Lionel Van Deerlin
|  | Democratic
| 1962
| Incumbent re-elected.
| nowrap | 

|-
| 
| Patrick M. Martin
|  | Republican
| 1962
|  | Incumbent lost re-election.New member elected.Democratic gain.
| nowrap | 

|}

Colorado 

|-
| 
| Byron G. Rogers
|  | Democratic
| 1950
| Incumbent re-elected.
| nowrap | 

|-
| 
| Donald G. Brotzman
|  | Republican
| 1962
|  | Incumbent lost re-election.New member elected.Democratic gain.
| nowrap | 

|-
| 
| John Chenoweth
|  | Republican
| 1950
|  | Incumbent lost re-election.New member elected.Democratic gain.
| nowrap | 

|-
| 
| Wayne N. Aspinall
|  | Democratic
| 1948
| Incumbent re-elected.
| nowrap | 

|}

Connecticut 

Connecticut eliminated its at-large seat and redistricted from 5 districts to 6, creating a new district in the northwestern part of the state.

|-
| 
| Emilio Q. Daddario
|  | Democratic
| 1958
| Incumbent re-elected.
| nowrap | 

|-
| 
| William St. Onge
|  | Democratic
| 1962
| Incumbent re-elected.
| nowrap | 

|-
| 
| Robert Giaimo
|  | Democratic
| 1958
| Incumbent re-elected.
| nowrap | 

|-
| 
| Abner W. Sibal
|  | Republican
| 1960
|  | Incumbent lost re-election.New member elected.Democratic gain.
| nowrap | 

|-
| 
| John S. Monagan
|  | Democratic
| 1958
| Incumbent re-elected.
| nowrap | 

|-
| 
| Bernard F. GrabowskiRedistricted from at-large
|  | Democratic
| 1962
| Incumbent re-elected.
| nowrap | 

|}

Delaware 

|-
| 
| Harris McDowell
|  | Democratic
| 1958
| Incumbent re-elected.
| nowrap | 

|}

Florida 

|-
| 
| Bob Sikes
|  | Democratic
| 19401944 1974
| Incumbent re-elected.
| nowrap | 

|-
| 
| Charles E. Bennett
|  | Democratic
| 1948
| Incumbent re-elected.
| nowrap | 

|-
| 
| Claude Pepper
|  | Democratic
| 1962
| Incumbent re-elected.
| nowrap | 

|-
| 
| Dante Fascell
|  | Democratic
| 1954
| Incumbent re-elected.
| nowrap | 

|-
| 
| Syd Herlong
|  | Democratic
| 1948
| Incumbent re-elected.
| nowrap | 

|-
| 
| Paul Rogers
|  | Democratic
| 1954
| Incumbent re-elected.
| nowrap | 

|-
| 
| James A. Haley
|  | Democratic
| 1952
| Incumbent re-elected.
| nowrap | 

|-
| 
| Donald Ray Matthews
|  | Democratic
| 1952
| Incumbent re-elected.
| nowrap | 

|-
| 
| Don Fuqua
|  | Democratic
| 1962
| Incumbent re-elected.
| nowrap | 

|-
| 
| Sam Gibbons
|  | Democratic
| 1962
| Incumbent re-elected.
| nowrap | 

|-
| 
| Edward Gurney
|  | Republican
| 1962
| Incumbent re-elected.
| nowrap | 

|-
| 
| William C. Cramer
|  | Republican
| 1954
| Incumbent re-elected.
| nowrap | 

|}

Georgia 

Georgia redistricted its existing 12 districts, dividing the Atlanta-area 5th district into a 4th and 5th district, renumbering the existing 4th district to the 6th, and dividing the existing central Georgia 6th district up between its neighbors with compensating boundary changes elsewhere.

|-
| 
| George Elliott Hagan
|  | Democratic
| 1960
| Incumbent re-elected.
| nowrap | 

|-
| 
| J. L. Pilcher
|  | Democratic
| 1953
|  | Incumbent retired.New member elected.Democratic hold.
| nowrap | 

|-
| 
| Tic Forrester
|  | Democratic
| 1950
|  | Incumbent retired.New member elected.Republican gain.
| nowrap | 

|-
| 
| colspan=3  | None (District created)
|  | New seat.New member elected.Democratic gain.
| nowrap | 

|-
| 
| Charles L. Weltner
|  | Democratic
| 1962
| Incumbent re-elected.
| nowrap | 

|-
| 
| John FlyntRedistricted from 4th
|  | Democratic
| 1954
| Incumbent re-elected.
| nowrap | 

|-
| 
| John William Davis
|  | Democratic
| 1960
| Incumbent re-elected.
| nowrap | 

|-
| 
| J. Russell Tuten
|  | Democratic
| 1962
| Incumbent re-elected.
| nowrap | 

|-
| 
| Phillip M. Landrum
|  | Democratic
| 1952
| Incumbent re-elected.
| nowrap | 

|-
| rowspan=2  | 
| Robert Grier Stephens Jr.
|  | Democratic
| 1960
| Incumbent re-elected.
| rowspan=2 nowrap | 

|-
| Carl VinsonRedistricted from 6th
|  | Democratic
| 1914
|  | Incumbent retired.Democratic loss.

|}

Hawaii 

|-
| 
| Spark Matsunaga
|  | Democratic
| 1962
| Incumbent re-elected.
| rowspan=2 nowrap | 

|-
| 
| Thomas Gill
|  | Democratic
| 1962
|  | Incumbent retired to run for U.S. Senator.New member elected.Democratic hold.

|}

Idaho 

|-
| 
| Compton I. White Jr.
|  | Democratic
| 1962
| Incumbent re-elected.
| nowrap | 

|-
| 
| Ralph R. Harding
|  | Democratic
| 1960
|  | Incumbent lost re-election.New member elected.Republican gain.
| nowrap | 

|}

Illinois 

|-
| 
| William L. Dawson
|  | Democratic
| 1942
| Incumbent re-elected.
| 

|-
| 
| Barratt O'Hara
|  | Democratic
| 19481950 1952
| Incumbent re-elected.
| 

|-
| 
| William T. Murphy
|  | Democratic
| 1958
| Incumbent re-elected.
| 

|-
| 
| Ed Derwinski
|  | Republican
| 1958
| Incumbent re-elected.
| 

|-
| 
| John C. Kluczynski
|  | Democratic
| 1950
| Incumbent re-elected.
| 

|-
| 
| Thomas J. O'Brien
|  | Democratic
| 1942
|  | Incumbent died in office.New member elected.Democratic hold.
| 

|-
| 
| Roland V. Libonati
|  | Democratic
| 1957
|  | Incumbent retired.New member elected.Democratic hold.
| 

|-
| 
| Dan Rostenkowski
|  | Democratic
| 1958
| Incumbent re-elected.
| 

|-
| 
| Edward Rowan Finnegan
|  | Democratic
| 1960
|  | Incumbent retired.New member elected.Democratic hold.
| 

|-
| 
| Harold R. Collier
|  | Republican
| 1956
| Incumbent re-elected.
| 

|-
| 
| Roman Pucinski
|  | Democratic
| 1958
| Incumbent re-elected.
| 

|-
| 
| Robert McClory
|  | Republican
| 1962
| Incumbent re-elected.
| 

|-
| 
| Donald Rumsfeld
|  | Republican
| 1962
| Incumbent re-elected.
| 

|-
| 
| Elmer J. Hoffman
|  | Republican
| 1958
|  | Incumbent retired.New member elected.Republican hold.
| 

|-
| 
| Charlotte Thompson Reid
|  | Republican
| 1962
| Incumbent re-elected.
| 

|-
| 
| John B. Anderson
|  | Republican
| 1960
| Incumbent re-elected.
| 

|-
| 
| Leslie C. Arends
|  | Republican
| 1934
| Incumbent re-elected.
| 

|-
| 
| Robert H. Michel
|  | Republican
| 1956
| Incumbent re-elected.
| 

|-
| 
| Robert T. McLoskey
|  | Republican
| 1962
|  | Incumbent lost re-election.New member elected.Democratic gain.
| 

|-
| 
| Paul Findley
|  | Republican
| 1960
| Incumbent re-elected.
| 

|-
| 
| Kenneth J. Gray
|  | Democratic
| 1954
| Incumbent re-elected.
| 

|-
| 
| William L. Springer
|  | Republican
| 1950
| Incumbent re-elected.
| 

|-
| 
| George E. Shipley
|  | Democratic
| 1958
| Incumbent re-elected.
| 

|-
| 
| Melvin Price
|  | Democratic
| 1944
| Incumbent re-elected.
| 

|}

Indiana 

|-
| 
| Ray Madden
|  | Democratic
| 1942
| Incumbent re-elected.
| nowrap | 

|-
| 
| Charles A. Halleck
|  | Republican
| 1935
| Incumbent re-elected.
| nowrap | 

|-
| 
| John Brademas
|  | Democratic
| 1958
| Incumbent re-elected.
| nowrap | 

|-
| 
| E. Ross Adair
|  | Republican
| 1950
| Incumbent re-elected.
| nowrap | 

|-
| 
| J. Edward Roush
|  | Democratic
| 1958
| Incumbent re-elected.
| nowrap | 

|-
| 
| Richard L. Roudebush
|  | Republican
| 1960
| Incumbent re-elected.
| nowrap | 

|-
| 
| William G. Bray
|  | Republican
| 1950
| Incumbent re-elected.
| nowrap | 

|-
| 
| Winfield K. Denton
|  | Democratic
| 1954
| Incumbent re-elected.
| nowrap | 

|-
| 
| Earl Wilson
|  | Republican
| 1960
|  | Incumbent lost re-election.New member elected.Democratic gain.
| nowrap | 

|-
| 
| Ralph Harvey
|  | Republican
| 1960
| Incumbent re-elected.
| nowrap | 

|-
| 
| Donald C. Bruce
|  | Republican
| 1960
|  | Incumbent retired to run for U.S. Senator.New member elected.Democratic gain.
| nowrap | 

|}

Iowa 

|-
| 
| Fred Schwengel
|  | Republican
| 1954
|  | Incumbent lost re-election.New member elected.Democratic gain.
| nowrap | 

|-
| 
| James E. Bromwell
|  | Republican
| 1960
|  | Incumbent lost re-election.New member elected.Democratic gain.
| nowrap | 

|-
| 
| H. R. Gross
|  | Republican
| 1948
| Incumbent re-elected.
| nowrap | 

|-
| 
| John Henry Kyl
|  | Republican
| 1959 
|  | Incumbent lost re-election.New member elected.Democratic gain.
| nowrap | 

|-
| 
| Neal Edward Smith
|  | Democratic
| 1958
| Incumbent re-elected.
| nowrap | 

|-
| 
| Charles B. Hoeven
|  | Republican
| 1942
|  | Incumbent retired.New member elected.Democratic gain.
| nowrap | 

|-
| 
| Ben F. Jensen
|  | Republican
| 1938
|  | Incumbent lost re-election.New member elected.Democratic gain.
| nowrap | 

|}

Kansas 

|-
| 
| Bob Dole
|  | Republican
| 1960
| Incumbent re-elected.
| nowrap | 

|-
| 
| William H. Avery
|  | Republican
| 1954
|  | Incumbent retired to run for Governor.New member elected.Republican hold.
| nowrap | 

|-
| 
| Robert Ellsworth
|  | Republican
| 1960
| Incumbent re-elected.
| nowrap | 

|-
| 
| Garner E. Shriver
|  | Republican
| 1960
| Incumbent re-elected.
| nowrap | 

|-
| 
| Joe Skubitz
|  | Republican
| 1962
| Incumbent re-elected.
| nowrap | 

|}

Kentucky 

|-
| 
| Frank Stubblefield
|  | Democratic
| 1958
| Incumbent re-elected.
| nowrap | 

|-
| 
| William Natcher
|  | Democratic
| 1953 
| Incumbent re-elected.
| nowrap | 

|-
| 
| Gene Snyder
|  | Republican
| 1962
|  | Incumbent lost re-election.New member elected.Democratic gain.
| nowrap | 

|-
| 
| Frank Chelf
|  | Democratic
| 1944
| Incumbent re-elected.
| nowrap | 

|-
| 
| Eugene Siler
|  | Republican
| 1954
|  | Incumbent retired.New member elected.Republican hold.
| nowrap | 

|-
| 
| John C. Watts
|  | Democratic
| 1951 
| Incumbent re-elected.
| nowrap | 

|-
| 
| Carl D. Perkins
|  | Democratic
| 1948
| Incumbent re-elected.
| nowrap | 

|}

Louisiana 

|-
| 
| F. Edward Hébert
|  | Democratic
| 1940
| Incumbent re-elected.
| nowrap | 

|-
| 
| Hale Boggs
|  | Democratic
| 19401942 1946
| Incumbent re-elected.
| nowrap | 

|-
| 
| Edwin E. Willis
|  | Democratic
| 1948
| Incumbent re-elected.
| nowrap | 

|-
| 
| Joe Waggonner
|  | Democratic
| 1961
| Incumbent re-elected.
| nowrap | 

|-
| 
| Otto Passman
|  | Democratic
| 1946
| Incumbent re-elected.
| nowrap | 

|-
| 
| James H. Morrison
|  | Democratic
| 1942
| Incumbent re-elected.
| nowrap | 

|-
| 
| T. Ashton Thompson
|  | Democratic
| 1952
| Incumbent re-elected.
| nowrap | 

|-
| 
| Gillis William Long
|  | Democratic
| 1962
|  | Incumbent lost renomination.New member elected.Democratic hold.
| nowrap | 

|}

Maine 

|-
| 
| Stanley R. Tupper
|  | Republican
| 1960
| Incumbent re-elected.
| nowrap | 

|-
| 
| Clifford McIntire
|  | Republican
| 1951
|  | Incumbent retired to run for U.S. Senator.New member elected.Democratic gain.
| nowrap | 

|}

Maryland 

|-
| 
| Rogers Morton
|  | Republican
| 1962
| Incumbent re-elected.
| nowrap | 

|-
| 
| Clarence Long
|  | Democratic
| 1962
| Incumbent re-elected.
| nowrap | 

|-
| 
| Edward Garmatz
|  | Democratic
| 1947
| Incumbent re-elected.
| nowrap | 

|-
| 
| George Hyde Fallon
|  | Democratic
| 1944
| Incumbent re-elected.
| nowrap | 

|-
| 
| Richard Lankford
|  | Democratic
| 1954
|  | Incumbent retired.New member elected.Democratic hold.
| nowrap | 

|-
| 
| Charles Mathias
|  | Republican
| 1960
| Incumbent re-elected.
| nowrap | 

|-
| 
| Samuel Friedel
|  | Democratic
| 1952
| Incumbent re-elected.
| nowrap | 

|-
| 
| Carlton R. Sickles
|  | Democratic
| 1962
| Incumbent re-elected.
| nowrap | 

|}

Massachusetts 

|-
| 
| Silvio O. Conte
|  | Republican
| 1958
| Incumbent re-elected.
| nowrap | 

|-
| 
| Edward Boland
|  | Democratic
| 1952
| Incumbent re-elected.
| nowrap | 

|-
| 
| Philip J. Philbin
|  | Democratic
| 1942
| Incumbent re-elected.
| nowrap | 

|-
| 
| Harold Donohue
|  | Democratic
| 1946
| Incumbent re-elected.
| nowrap | 

|-
| 
| F. Bradford Morse
|  | Republican
| 1960
| Incumbent re-elected.
| nowrap | 

|-
| 
| William H. Bates
|  | Republican
| 1950
| Incumbent re-elected.
| nowrap | 

|-
| 
| Torbert Macdonald
|  | Democratic
| 1954
| Incumbent re-elected.
| nowrap | 

|-
| 
| Tip O'Neill
|  | Democratic
| 1952
| Incumbent re-elected.
| nowrap | 

|-
| 
| John W. McCormack
|  | Democratic
| 1928
| Incumbent re-elected.
| nowrap | 

|-
| 
| Joseph W. Martin Jr.
|  | Republican
| 1924
| Incumbent re-elected.
| nowrap | 

|-
| 
| James A. Burke
|  | Democratic
| 1958
| Incumbent re-elected.
| nowrap | 

|-
| 
| Hastings Keith
|  | Republican
| 1958
| Incumbent re-elected.
| nowrap | 

|}

Michigan 

Michigan redistricted, converting its at-large seat into a 19th district and realigning the other districts to account for population growth in the Detroit suburbs. Two Democratic seats and one Republican seat were eliminated or combined at redistricting, but the defeat of three Republican incumbents and the election of Democrats to all the new seats yielded a net shift of four seats, changing the party balance from 11–8 Republican to 12–7 Democratic.

|-
| 
| colspan=3  | None (District created)
|  | New seat.New member elected.Democratic gain.
| nowrap | 

|-
| 
| George Meader
|  | Republican
| 1950
|  | Incumbent lost re-election.New member elected.Democratic gain.
| nowrap | 

|-
| 
| August E. Johansen
|  | Republican
| 1954
|  | Incumbent lost re-election.New member elected.Democratic gain.
| nowrap | 

|-
| 
| J. Edward Hutchinson
|  | Republican
| 1962
| Incumbent re-elected.
| nowrap | 

|-
| 
| Gerald Ford
|  | Republican
| 1948
| Incumbent re-elected.
| nowrap | 

|-
| 
| Charles E. Chamberlain
|  | Republican
| 1956
| Incumbent re-elected.
| nowrap | 

|-
| 
| colspan=3  | None (District created)
|  | New seat.New member elected.Democratic gain.
| nowrap | 

|-
| 
| R. James Harvey
|  | Republican
| 1960
| Incumbent re-elected.
| nowrap | 

|-
| 
| Robert P. Griffin
|  | Republican
| 1956
| Incumbent re-elected.
| nowrap | 

|-
| 
| Elford Albin Cederberg
|  | Republican
| 1952
| Incumbent re-elected.
| nowrap | 

|-
| rowspan=2  | 
| Victor A. Knox
|  | Republican
| 1952
|  | Incumbent lost re-election.New member elected.Democratic gain.
| rowspan=2 nowrap | 

|-
| John B. BennettRedistricted from 12th
|  | Republican
| 1946
|  | Incumbent died August 9, 1964.Republican loss.

|-
| 
| James G. O'HaraRedistricted from 7th
|  | Democratic
| 1958
| Incumbent re-elected.
| nowrap | 

|-
| 
| Charles Diggs
|  | Democratic
| 1954
| Incumbent re-elected.
| nowrap | 

|-
| rowspan=2  | 
| Harold M. Ryan
|  | Democratic
| 1962
|  | Incumbent lost renomination.Democratic loss.
| rowspan=2 nowrap | 

|-
| Lucien NedziRedistricted from 1st
|  | Democratic
| 1961
| Incumbent re-elected.

|-
| 
| colspan=3  | None (District created)
|  | New seat.New member elected.Democratic gain.
| nowrap | 

|-
| rowspan=2  | 
| John Lesinski Jr.
|  | Democratic
| 1950
|  | Incumbent lost renomination.Democratic loss.
| rowspan=2 nowrap | 

|-
| John D. Dingell Jr.Redistricted from 15th
|  | Democratic
| 1955 
| Incumbent re-elected.

|-
| 
| Martha W. Griffiths
|  | Democratic
| 1954
| Incumbent re-elected.
| nowrap | 

|-
| 
| William Broomfield
|  | Republican
| 1956
| Incumbent re-elected.
| nowrap | 

|-
| 
| Neil StaeblerRedistricted from at-large
|  | Democratic
| 1962
|  | Incumbent retired to run for Governor of Michigan.New member elected.Democratic hold.
| nowrap | 

|}

Minnesota 

|-
| 
| Al Quie
|  | Republican
| 1958
| Incumbent re-elected.
| nowrap | 

|-
| 
| Ancher Nelsen
|  | Republican
| 1958
| Incumbent re-elected.
| nowrap | 

|-
| 
| Clark MacGregor
|  | Republican
| 1960
| Incumbent re-elected.
| nowrap | 

|-
| 
| Joseph Karth
|  | Democratic
| 1958
| Incumbent re-elected.
| nowrap | 

|-
| 
| Donald M. Fraser
|  | Democratic
| 1962
| Incumbent re-elected.
| nowrap | 

|-
| 
| Alec G. Olson
|  | Democratic
| 1962
| Incumbent re-elected.
| nowrap | 

|-
| 
| Odin Langen
|  | Republican
| 1958
| Incumbent re-elected.
| nowrap | 

|-
| 
| John Blatnik
|  | Democratic
| 1946
| Incumbent re-elected.
| nowrap | 

|}

Mississippi 

|-
| 
| Thomas Abernethy
|  | Democratic
| 1942
| Incumbent re-elected.
| nowrap | 

|-
| 
| Jamie Whitten
|  | Democratic
| 1941
| Incumbent re-elected.
| nowrap | 

|-
| 
| John Bell Williams
|  | Democratic
| 1946
| Incumbent re-elected.
| nowrap | 

|-
| 
| W. Arthur Winstead
|  | Democratic
| 1942
|  | Incumbent lost re-election.New member elected.Republican gain.
| nowrap | 

|-
| 
| William M. Colmer
|  | Democratic
| 1932
| Incumbent re-elected.
| nowrap | 

|}

Missouri 

|-
| 
| Frank M. Karsten
|  | Democratic
| 1946
| Incumbent re-elected.
| nowrap | 

|-
| 
| Thomas B. Curtis
|  | Republican
| 1950
| Incumbent re-elected.
| nowrap | 

|-
| 
| Leonor Sullivan
|  | Democratic
| 1952
| Incumbent re-elected.
| nowrap | 

|-
| 
| William J. Randall
|  | Democratic
| 1959 
| Incumbent re-elected.
| nowrap | 

|-
| 
| Richard Walker Bolling
|  | Democratic
| 1948
| Incumbent re-elected.
| nowrap | 

|-
| 
| William Raleigh Hull Jr.
|  | Democratic
| 1954
| Incumbent re-elected.
| nowrap | 

|-
| 
| Durward Gorham Hall
|  | Republican
| 1960
| Incumbent re-elected.
| nowrap | 

|-
| 
| Richard Howard Ichord Jr.
|  | Democratic
| 1960
| Incumbent re-elected.
| nowrap | 

|-
| 
| Clarence Cannon
|  | Democratic
| 1922
|  | Died in officeDemocratic hold.
| nowrap | 

|-
| 
| Paul C. Jones
|  | Democratic
| 1948
| Incumbent re-elected.
| nowrap | 

|}

Montana 

|-
| 
| Arnold Olsen
|  | Democratic
| 1960
| Incumbent re-elected.
| nowrap | 

|-
| 
| James F. Battin
|  | Republican
| 1960
| Incumbent re-elected.
| nowrap | 

|}

Nebraska 

|-
| 
| Ralph F. Beermann
|  | Republican
| 1960
|  | Incumbent lost re-election.New member elected.Democratic gain.
| nowrap | 

|-
| 
| Glenn Cunningham
|  | Republican
| 1956
| Incumbent re-elected.
| nowrap | 

|-
| 
| David Martin
|  | Republican
| 1960
| Incumbent re-elected.
| nowrap | 

|}

Nevada 

|-
| 
| Walter S. Baring Jr.
|  | Democratic
| 19481952 1956
| Incumbent re-elected.
| nowrap | 

|}

New Hampshire 

|-
| 
| Louis C. Wyman
|  | Republican
| 1962
|  | Incumbent lost re-election.New member elected.Democratic gain.
| nowrap | 

|-
| 
| James Colgate Cleveland
|  | Republican
| 1962
| Incumbent re-elected.
| nowrap | 

|}

New Jersey 

|-
| 
| William T. Cahill
|  | Republican
| 1958
| Incumbent re-elected.
| nowrap | 

|-
| 
| Milton W. Glenn
|  | Republican
| 1957
|  | Incumbent lost re-election.New member elected.Democratic gain.
| nowrap | 

|-
| 
| James C. Auchincloss
|  | Republican
| 1942
|  | Incumbent retired.New member elected.Democratic gain.
| nowrap | 

|-
| 
| Frank Thompson
|  | Democratic
| 1954
| Incumbent re-elected.
| nowrap | 

|-
| 
| Peter Frelinghuysen Jr.
|  | Republican
| 1952
| Incumbent re-elected.
| nowrap | 

|-
| 
| Florence P. Dwyer
|  | Republican
| 1956
| Incumbent re-elected.
| nowrap | 

|-
| 
| William B. Widnall
|  | Republican
| 1950
| Incumbent re-elected.
| nowrap | 

|-
| 
| Charles Samuel Joelson
|  | Democratic
| 1960
| Incumbent re-elected.
| nowrap | 

|-
| 
| Frank C. Osmers Jr.
|  | Republican
| 1951
|  | Incumbent lost re-election.New member elected.Democratic gain.
| nowrap | 

|-
| 
| Peter W. Rodino
|  | Democratic
| 1948
| Incumbent re-elected.
| nowrap | 

|-
| 
| Joseph Minish
|  | Democratic
| 1962
| Incumbent re-elected.
| nowrap | 

|-
| 
| George M. Wallhauser
|  | Republican
| 1958
|  | Incumbent retired.New member elected.Democratic gain.
| nowrap | 

|-
| 
| Cornelius Gallagher
|  | Democratic
| 1958
| Incumbent re-elected.
| nowrap | 

|-
| 
| Dominick V. Daniels
|  | Democratic
| 1958
| Incumbent re-elected.
| nowrap | 

|-
| 
| Edward J. Patten
|  | Democratic
| 1962
| Incumbent re-elected.
| nowrap | 

|}

New Mexico 

|-
| 
| Thomas G. Morris
|  | Democratic
| 1958
| Incumbent re-elected.
| rowspan=2 nowrap | 

|-
| 
| Joseph Montoya
|  | Democratic
| 1957 (Special)
|  | Incumbent retired to run for U.S. Senator.New member elected.Democratic hold.

|}

New York 

|-
| 
| Otis G. Pike
|  | Democratic
| 1960
| Incumbent re-elected.
| nowrap | 

|-
| 
| James R. Grover Jr.
|  | Republican
| 1962
| Incumbent re-elected.
| nowrap | 

|-
| 
| Steven Derounian
|  | Republican
| 1952
|  | Incumbent lost re-election.New member elected.Democratic gain.
| nowrap | 

|-
| 
| John W. Wydler
|  | Republican
| 1962
| Incumbent re-elected.
| nowrap | 

|-
| 
| Frank J. Becker
|  | Republican
| 1952
|  | Incumbent retired.New member elected.Democratic gain.
| nowrap | 

|-
| 
| Seymour Halpern
|  | Republican
| 1958
| Incumbent re-elected.
| nowrap | 

|-
| 
| Joseph P. Addabbo
|  | Democratic
| 1960
| Incumbent re-elected.
| nowrap | 

|-
| 
| Benjamin Stanley Rosenthal
|  | Democratic
| 1962
| Incumbent re-elected.
| nowrap | 

|-
| 
| James J. Delaney
|  | Democratic
| 19441946 1948
| Incumbent re-elected.
| nowrap | 

|-
| 
| Emanuel Celler
|  | Democratic
| 1922
| Incumbent re-elected.
| nowrap | 

|-
| 
| Eugene James Keogh
|  | Democratic
| 1936
| Incumbent re-elected.
| nowrap | 

|-
| 
| Edna F. Kelly
|  | Democratic
| 1949
| Incumbent re-elected.
| nowrap | 

|-
| 
| Abraham J. Multer
|  | Democratic
| 1947
| Incumbent re-elected.
| nowrap | 

|-
| 
| John J. Rooney
|  | Democratic
| 1944
| Incumbent re-elected.
| nowrap | 

|-
| 
| Hugh Carey
|  | Democratic
| 1960
| Incumbent re-elected.
| nowrap | 

|-
| 
| John M. Murphy
|  | Democratic
| 1962
| Incumbent re-elected.
| nowrap | 

|-
| 
| John Lindsay
|  | Republican
| 1958
| Incumbent re-elected.
| nowrap | 

|-
| 
| Adam Clayton Powell Jr.
|  | Democratic
| 1944
| Incumbent re-elected.
| nowrap | 

|-
| 
| Leonard Farbstein
|  | Democratic
| 1956
| Incumbent re-elected.
| nowrap | 

|-
| 
| William Fitts Ryan
|  | Democratic
| 1960
| Incumbent re-elected.
| nowrap | 

|-
| 
| James C. Healey
|  | Democratic
| 1956
|  | Incumbent lost renomination.New member elected.Democratic hold.
| nowrap | 

|-
| 
| Jacob H. Gilbert
|  | Democratic
| 1960
| Incumbent re-elected.
| nowrap | 

|-
| 
| Charles A. Buckley
|  | Democratic
| 1934
|  | Incumbent lost renomination.New member elected.Democratic hold.
| nowrap | 

|-
| 
| Paul A. Fino
|  | Republican
| 1952
| Incumbent re-elected.
| nowrap | 

|-
| 
| Robert R. Barry
|  | Republican
| 1958
|  | Incumbent lost re-election.New member elected.Democratic gain.
| nowrap | 

|-
| 
| Ogden R. Reid
|  | Republican
| 1962
| Incumbent re-elected.
| nowrap | 

|-
| 
| Katharine St. George
|  | Republican
| 1946
|  | Incumbent lost re-election.New member elected.Democratic gain.
| nowrap | 

|-
| 
| J. Ernest Wharton
|  | Republican
| 1950
|  | Incumbent lost re-election.New member elected.Democratic gain.
| nowrap | 

|-
| 
| Leo W. O'Brien
|  | Democratic
| 1952
| Incumbent re-elected.
| nowrap | 

|-
| 
| Carleton J. King
|  | Republican
| 1960
| Incumbent re-elected.
| nowrap | 

|-
| 
| Clarence E. Kilburn
|  | Republican
| 1940
|  | Incumbent retired.New member elected.Republican hold.
| nowrap | 

|-
| 
| Alexander Pirnie
|  | Republican
| 1958
| Incumbent re-elected.
| nowrap | 

|-
| 
| Howard W. Robison
|  | Republican
| 1958
| Incumbent re-elected.
| nowrap | 

|-
| 
| R. Walter Riehlman
|  | Republican
| 1946
|  | Incumbent lost re-election.New member elected.Democratic gain.
| nowrap | 

|-
| 
| Samuel S. Stratton
|  | Democratic
| 1958
| Incumbent re-elected.
| nowrap | 

|-
| 
| Frank Horton
|  | Republican
| 1962
| Incumbent re-elected.
| nowrap | 

|-
| 
| Harold C. Ostertag
|  | Republican
| 1950
|  | Incumbent retired.New member elected.Republican hold.
| nowrap | 

|-
| 
| Charles Goodell
|  | Republican
| 1959
| Incumbent re-elected.
| nowrap | 

|-
| 
| John R. Pillion
|  | Republican
| 1952
|  | Incumbent lost re-election.New member elected.Democratic gain.
| nowrap | 

|-
| 
| William E. Miller
|  | Republican
| 1950
|  | Incumbent retired to run for Vice President.New member elected.Republican hold.
| nowrap | 

|-
| 
| Thaddeus J. Dulski
|  | Democratic
| 1958
| Incumbent re-elected.
| nowrap | 

|}

North Carolina 

|-
| 
| Herbert Covington Bonner
|  | Democratic
| 1940
| Incumbent re-elected.
| nowrap | 

|-
| 
| Lawrence H. Fountain
|  | Democratic
| 1952
| Incumbent re-elected.
| nowrap | 

|-
| 
| David N. Henderson
|  | Democratic
| 1960
| Incumbent re-elected.
| nowrap | 

|-
| 
| Harold D. Cooley
|  | Democratic
| 1934
| Incumbent re-elected.
| nowrap | 

|-
| 
| Ralph James Scott
|  | Democratic
| 1956
| Incumbent re-elected.
| nowrap | 

|-
| 
| Horace R. Kornegay
|  | Democratic
| 1960
| Incumbent re-elected.
| nowrap | 

|-
| 
| Alton Lennon
|  | Democratic
| 1956
| Incumbent re-elected.
| nowrap | 

|-
| 
| Charles R. Jonas
|  | Republican
| 1952
| Incumbent re-elected.
| nowrap | 

|-
| 
| Jim Broyhill
|  | Republican
| 1962
| Incumbent re-elected.
| nowrap | 

|-
| 
| Basil Lee Whitener
|  | Democratic
| 1956
| Incumbent re-elected.
| nowrap | 

|-
| 
| Roy A. Taylor
|  | Democratic
| 1960
| Incumbent re-elected.
| nowrap | 

|}

North Dakota 

|-
| 
| Mark Andrews
|  | Republican
| 1963
| Incumbent re-elected.
| nowrap | 

|-
| 
| Don L. Short
|  | Republican
| 1958
|  | Incumbent lost re-election.New member elected.Democratic gain.
| nowrap | 

|}

Ohio 

|-
| 
| Carl West Rich
|  | Republican
| 1962
|  | Incumbent lost re-election.New member elected.Democratic gain.
| nowrap | 

|-
| 
| Donald D. Clancy
|  | Republican
| 1960
| Incumbent re-elected.
| nowrap | 

|-
| 
| Paul F. Schenck
|  | Republican
| 1951
|  | Incumbent lost re-election.New member elected.Democratic gain.
| nowrap | 

|-
| 
| William Moore McCulloch
|  | Republican
| 1947
| Incumbent re-elected.
| nowrap | 

|-
| 
| Del Latta
|  | Republican
| 1958
| Incumbent re-elected.
| nowrap | 

|-
| 
| Bill Harsha
|  | Republican
| 1960
| Incumbent re-elected.
| nowrap | 

|-
| 
| Clarence J. Brown
|  | Republican
| 1938
| Incumbent re-elected.
| nowrap | 

|-
| 
| Jackson Edward Betts
|  | Republican
| 1950
| Incumbent re-elected.
| nowrap | 

|-
| 
| Thomas L. Ashley
|  | Democratic
| 1954
| Incumbent re-elected.
| nowrap | 

|-
| 
| Pete Abele
|  | Republican
| 1962
|  | Incumbent lost re-election.New member elected.Democratic gain.
| nowrap | 

|-
| 
| Oliver P. Bolton
|  | Republican
| 1962
|  | Ran for at-large seatRepublican hold.
| nowrap | 

|-
| 
| Samuel L. Devine
|  | Republican
| 1958
| Incumbent re-elected.
| nowrap | 

|-
| 
| Charles Adams Mosher
|  | Republican
| 1960
| Incumbent re-elected.
| nowrap | 

|-
| 
| William Hanes Ayres
|  | Republican
| 1950
| Incumbent re-elected.
| nowrap | 

|-
| 
| Robert T. Secrest
|  | Democratic
| 1962
| Incumbent re-elected.
| nowrap | 

|-
| 
| Frank T. Bow
|  | Republican
| 1950
| Incumbent re-elected.
| nowrap | 

|-
| 
| John M. Ashbrook
|  | Republican
| 1960
| Incumbent re-elected.
| nowrap | 

|-
| 
| Wayne Hays
|  | Democratic
| 1948
| Incumbent re-elected.
| nowrap | 

|-
| 
| Michael J. Kirwan
|  | Democratic
| 1936
| Incumbent re-elected.
| nowrap | 

|-
| 
| Michael A. Feighan
|  | Democratic
| 1942
| Incumbent re-elected.
| nowrap | 

|-
| 
| Charles Vanik
|  | Democratic
| 1954
| Incumbent re-elected.
| nowrap | 

|-
| 
| Frances P. Bolton
|  | Republican
| 1940
| Incumbent re-elected.
| nowrap | 

|-
| 
| William Edwin Minshall Jr.
|  | Republican
| 1954
| Incumbent re-elected.
| nowrap | 

|-
| 
| Robert Taft Jr.
|  | Republican
| 1962
|  | Incumbent retired to run for U.S. Senator.New member elected.Democratic gain.
| nowrap | 

|}

Oklahoma 

|-
| 
| Page Belcher
|  | Republican
| 1950
| Incumbent re-elected.
| nowrap | 

|-
| 
| Ed Edmondson
|  | Democratic
| 1952
| Incumbent re-elected.
| nowrap | 

|-
| 
| Carl Albert
|  | Democratic
| 1946
| Incumbent re-elected.
| nowrap | 

|-
| 
| Tom Steed
|  | Democratic
| 1948
| Incumbent re-elected.
| nowrap | 

|-
| 
| John Jarman
|  | Democratic
| 1950
| Incumbent re-elected.
| nowrap | 

|-
| 
| Victor Wickersham
|  | Democratic
| 1960
|  | Incumbent lost renomination.New member elected.Democratic hold.
| nowrap | 

|}

Oregon 

|-
| 
| A. Walter Norblad
|  | Republican
| 1946
|  | Died in officeRepublican hold.
| nowrap | 

|-
| 
| Al Ullman
|  | Democratic
| 1956
| Incumbent re-elected.
| nowrap | 

|-
| 
| Edith Green
|  | Democratic
| 1954
| Incumbent re-elected.
| nowrap | 

|-
| 
| Robert B. Duncan
|  | Democratic
| 1962
| Incumbent re-elected.
| nowrap | 

|}

Pennsylvania 

|-
| 
| William A. Barrett
|  | Democratic
| 19441946 1948
| Incumbent re-elected.
| nowrap | 

|-
| 
| Robert N. C. Nix Sr.
|  | Democratic
| 1958
| Incumbent re-elected.
| nowrap | 

|-
| 
| James A. Byrne
|  | Democratic
| 1952
| Incumbent re-elected.
| nowrap | 

|-
| 
| Herman Toll
|  | Democratic
| 1958
| Incumbent re-elected.
| nowrap | 

|-
| 
| William J. Green III
|  | Democratic
| 1964 
| Incumbent re-elected.
| nowrap | 

|-
| 
| George M. Rhodes
|  | Democratic
| 1948
| Incumbent re-elected.
| nowrap | 

|-
| 
| William H. Milliken Jr.
|  | Republican
| 1958
|  | Incumbent retired.New member elected.Republican hold.
| nowrap | 

|-
| 
| Willard S. Curtin
|  | Republican
| 1956
| Incumbent re-elected.
| nowrap | 

|-
| 
| Paul B. Dague
|  | Republican
| 1946
| Incumbent re-elected.
| nowrap | 

|-
| 
| Joseph M. McDade
|  | Republican
| 1962
| Incumbent re-elected.
| nowrap | 

|-
| 
| Dan Flood
|  | Democratic
| 19441946 19481952 1954
| Incumbent re-elected.
| nowrap | 

|-
| 
| J. Irving Whalley
|  | Republican
| 1960
| Incumbent re-elected.
| nowrap | 

|-
| 
| Richard Schweiker
|  | Republican
| 1960
| Incumbent re-elected.
| nowrap | 

|-
| 
| William S. Moorhead
|  | Democratic
| 1958
| Incumbent re-elected.
| nowrap | 

|-
| 
| Fred B. Rooney
|  | Democratic
| 1963
| Incumbent re-elected.
| nowrap | 

|-
| 
| John C. Kunkel
|  | Republican
| 1961
| Incumbent re-elected.
| nowrap | 

|-
| 
| Herman T. Schneebeli
|  | Republican
| 1960
| Incumbent re-elected.
| nowrap | 

|-
| 
| Robert J. Corbett
|  | Republican
| 19381940 1944
| Incumbent re-elected.
| nowrap | 

|-
| 
| George Atlee Goodling
|  | Republican
| 1960
|  | Incumbent lost re-election.New member elected.Democratic gain.
| nowrap | 

|-
| 
| Elmer J. Holland
|  | Democratic
| 1942 1942 1956 
| Incumbent re-elected.
| nowrap | 

|-
| 
| John Herman Dent
|  | Democratic
| 1958
| Incumbent re-elected.
| nowrap | 

|-
| 
| John P. Saylor
|  | Republican
| 1949
| Incumbent re-elected.
| nowrap | 

|-
| 
| Albert W. Johnson
|  | Republican
| 1963
| Incumbent re-elected.
| nowrap | 

|-
| 
| James D. Weaver
|  | Republican
| 1962
|  | Incumbent lost re-election.New member elected.Democratic gain.
| nowrap | 

|-
| 
| Frank M. Clark
|  | Democratic
| 1954
| Incumbent re-elected.
| nowrap | 

|-
| 
| Thomas E. Morgan
|  | Democratic
| 1944
| Incumbent re-elected.
| nowrap | 

|-
| 
| James G. Fulton
|  | Republican
| 1944
| Incumbent re-elected.
| nowrap | 

|}

Rhode Island 

|-
| 
| Fernand St. Germain
|  | Democratic
| 1960
| Incumbent re-elected.
| nowrap | 

|-
| 
| John E. Fogarty
|  | Democratic
| 1940
| Incumbent re-elected.
| nowrap | 

|}

South Carolina 

|-
| 
| L. Mendel Rivers
|  | Democratic
| 1940
| Incumbent re-elected.
| nowrap | 

|-
| 
| Albert Watson
|  | Democratic
| 1962
| Incumbent re-elected.
| nowrap | 

|-
| 
| William Jennings Bryan Dorn
|  | Democratic
| 19461948 1950
| Incumbent re-elected.
| nowrap | 

|-
| 
| Robert T. Ashmore
|  | Democratic
| 1953
| Incumbent re-elected.
| nowrap | 

|-
| 
| Robert W. Hemphill
|  | Democratic
| 1956
|  | Resigned when appointed to United States District Court for the Eastern District of South CarolinaDemocratic hold.
| nowrap | 

|-
| 
| John L. McMillan
|  | Democratic
| 1938
| Incumbent re-elected.
| nowrap | 

|}

South Dakota 

|-
| 
| Ben Reifel
|  | Republican
| 1960
| Incumbent re-elected.
| nowrap | 

|-
| 
| Ellis Yarnal Berry
|  | Republican
| 1950
| Incumbent re-elected.
| nowrap | 

|}

Tennessee 

|-
| 
| Jimmy Quillen
|  | Republican
| 1962
| Incumbent re-elected.
| nowrap | 

|-
| 
| Irene Baker
|  | Republican
| 1964 
|  | Incumbent retired.New member elected.Republican hold.
| nowrap | 

|-
| 
| Bill Brock
|  | Republican
| 1962
| Incumbent re-elected.
| nowrap | 

|-
| 
| Joe L. Evins
|  | Democratic
| 1946
| Incumbent re-elected.
| nowrap | 

|-
| 
| Richard Fulton
|  | Democratic
| 1946
| Incumbent re-elected.
| nowrap | 

|-
| 
| Ross Bass
|  | Democratic
| 1954
|  | Incumbent retired to run for U.S. Senator.New member elected.Democratic hold.
| nowrap | 

|-
| 
| Tom J. Murray
|  | Democratic
| 1942
| Incumbent re-elected.
| nowrap | 

|-
| 
| Fats Everett
|  | Democratic
| 1958
| Incumbent re-elected.
| nowrap | 

|-
| 
| Clifford Davis
|  | Democratic
| 1940
|  | Incumbent lost renomination.New member elected.Democratic hold.
| nowrap | 

|}

Texas 

|-
| 
| Wright Patman
|  | Democratic
| 1928
| Incumbent re-elected.
| nowrap | 

|-
| 
| Jack Brooks
|  | Democratic
| 1952
| Incumbent re-elected.
| nowrap | 

|-
| 
| Lindley Beckworth
|  | Democratic
| 1956
| Incumbent re-elected.
| nowrap | 

|-
| 
| Ray Roberts
|  | Democratic
| 1962
| Incumbent re-elected.
| nowrap | 

|-
| 
| Bruce R. Alger
|  | Republican
| 1954
|  | Incumbent lost re-election.New member elected.Democratic gain.
| nowrap | 

|-
| 
| Olin E. Teague
|  | Democratic
| 1946
| Incumbent re-elected.
| nowrap | 

|-
| 
| John Dowdy
|  | Democratic
| 1952
| Incumbent re-elected.
| nowrap | 

|-
| 
| Albert Thomas
|  | Democratic
| 1936
| Incumbent re-elected.
| nowrap | 

|-
| 
| Clark W. Thompson
|  | Democratic
| 1947
| Incumbent re-elected.
| nowrap | 

|-
| 
| J. J. Pickle
|  | Democratic
| 1963
| Incumbent re-elected.
| nowrap | 

|-
| 
| William R. Poage
|  | Democratic
| 1936
| Incumbent re-elected.
| nowrap | 

|-
| 
| Jim Wright
|  | Democratic
| 1954
| Incumbent re-elected.
| nowrap | 

|-
| 
| Graham B. Purcell Jr.
|  | Democratic
| 1962
| Incumbent re-elected.
| nowrap | 

|-
| 
| John Andrew Young
|  | Democratic
| 1956
| Incumbent re-elected.
| nowrap | 

|-
| 
| Joe M. Kilgore
|  | Democratic
| 1954
|  | Incumbent retired.New member elected.Democratic hold.
| nowrap | 

|-
| 
| Ed Foreman
|  | Republican
| 1962
|  | Incumbent lost re-election.New member elected.Democratic gain.
| nowrap | 

|-
| 
| Omar Burleson
|  | Democratic
| 1946
| Incumbent re-elected.
| nowrap | 

|-
| 
| Walter E. Rogers
|  | Democratic
| 1950
| Incumbent re-elected.
| nowrap | 

|-
| 
| George H. Mahon
|  | Democratic
| 1934
| Incumbent re-elected.
| nowrap | 

|-
| 
| Henry B. González
|  | Democratic
| 1961
| Incumbent re-elected.
| nowrap | 

|-
| 
| O. C. Fisher
|  | Democratic
| 1942
| Incumbent re-elected.
| nowrap | 

|-
| 
| Robert R. Casey
|  | Democratic
| 1958
| Incumbent re-elected.
| nowrap | 

|-
| 
| Joe R. Pool
|  | Democratic
| 1962
| Incumbent re-elected.
| nowrap | 

|}

Utah 

|-
| 
| Laurence J. Burton
|  | Republican
| 1962
| Incumbent re-elected.
| nowrap | 

|-
| 
| Sherman P. Lloyd
|  | Republican
| 1962
|  | Incumbent retired to run for U.S. Senator.New member elected.Democratic gain.
| nowrap | 

|}

Vermont 

|-
| 
| Robert Stafford
|  | Republican
| 1960
| Incumbent re-elected.
| nowrap | 

|}

Virginia 

|-
| 
| Thomas N. Downing
|  | Democratic
| 1958
| Incumbent re-elected.
| nowrap | 

|-
| 
| Porter Hardy Jr.
|  | Democratic
| 1946
| Incumbent re-elected.
| nowrap | 

|-
| 
| J. Vaughan Gary
|  | Democratic
| 1945
|  | Incumbent retired.New member elected.Democratic hold.
| nowrap | 

|-
| 
| Watkins Moorman Abbitt
|  | Democratic
| 1948
| Incumbent re-elected.
| nowrap | 

|-
| 
| William M. Tuck
|  | Democratic
| 1953
| Incumbent re-elected.
| nowrap | 

|-
| 
| Richard Harding Poff
|  | Republican
| 1952
| Incumbent re-elected.
| nowrap | 

|-
| 
| John Otho Marsh Jr.
|  | Democratic
| 1962
| Incumbent re-elected.
| nowrap | 

|-
| 
| Howard W. Smith
|  | Democratic
| 1930
| Incumbent re-elected.
| nowrap | 

|-
| 
| W. Pat Jennings
|  | Democratic
| 1954
| Incumbent re-elected.
| nowrap | 

|-
| 
| Joel Broyhill
|  | Republican
| 1952
| Incumbent re-elected.
| nowrap | 

|}

Washington 

|-
| 
| Thomas Pelly
|  | Republican
| 1952
| Incumbent re-elected.
| nowrap | 

|-
| 
| Jack Westland
|  | Republican
| 1952
|  | Incumbent lost re-election.New member elected.Democratic gain.
| nowrap | 

|-
| 
| Julia Butler Hansen
|  | Democratic
| 1960
| Incumbent re-elected.
| nowrap | 

|-
| 
| Catherine Dean May
|  | Republican
| 1958
| Incumbent re-elected.
| nowrap | 

|-
| 
| Walt Horan
|  | Republican
| 1942
|  | Incumbent lost re-election.New member elected.Democratic gain.
| nowrap | 

|-
| 
| Thor C. Tollefson
|  | Republican
| 1946
|  | Incumbent lost re-election.New member elected.Democratic gain.
| nowrap | 

|-
| 
| K. William Stinson
|  | Republican
| 1962
|  | Incumbent lost re-election.New member elected.Democratic gain.
| nowrap | 

|}

West Virginia 

|-
| 
| Arch A. Moore Jr.
|  | Republican
| 1956
| Incumbent re-elected.
| nowrap | 

|-
| 
| Harley Orrin Staggers
|  | Democratic
| 1948
| Incumbent re-elected.
| nowrap | 

|-
| 
| John M. Slack Jr.
|  | Democratic
| 1958
| Incumbent re-elected.
| nowrap | 

|-
| 
| Ken Hechler
|  | Democratic
| 1958
| Incumbent re-elected.
| nowrap | 

|-
| 
| Elizabeth Kee
|  | Democratic
| 1951 
|  | Incumbent retired.New member elected.Democratic hold.
| nowrap | 

|}

Wisconsin 

Wisconsin redistricted to adjust for demographic changes, merging the existing 9th district into the neighboring 3rd district in the west and forming a new 9th district in the Milwaukee suburbs with compensating boundary changes elsewhere.

|-
| 
| Henry C. Schadeberg
|  | Republican
| 1960
|  | Incumbent lost re-election.New member elected.Democratic gain.
| nowrap | 

|-
| 
| Robert Kastenmeier
|  | Democratic
| 1958
| Incumbent re-elected.
| nowrap | 

|-
| rowspan=2  | 
| Vernon Wallace Thomson
|  | Republican
| 1960
| Incumbent re-elected.
| rowspan=2 nowrap nowrap | 

|-
| Lester JohnsonRedistricted from 9th
|  | Democratic
| 1953
|  | Incumbent retired.Democratic loss.

|-
| 
| Clement J. Zablocki
|  | Democratic
| 1948
| Incumbent re-elected.
| nowrap | 

|-
| 
| Henry S. Reuss
|  | Democratic
| 1954
| Incumbent re-elected.
| nowrap | 

|-
| 
| William Van Pelt
|  | Republican
| 1950
|  | Incumbent lost re-election.New member elected.Democratic gain.
| nowrap | 

|-
| 
| Melvin Laird
|  | Republican
| 1952
| Incumbent re-elected.
| nowrap | 

|-
| 
| John W. Byrnes
|  | Republican
| 1944
| Incumbent re-elected.
| nowrap | 

|-
| 
| colspan=3  | None (District created)
|  | New seat.New member elected.Republican gain.
| nowrap | 

|-
| 
| Alvin O'Konski
|  | Republican
| 1942
| Incumbent re-elected.
| nowrap | 

|}

Wyoming 

|-
| 
| William Henry Harrison III
|  | Republican
| 19501954 1960
|  | Incumbent lost re-election.New member elected.Democratic gain.
| nowrap | 

|}

See also 
 1964 United States elections
 1964 United States Senate elections
 1964 United States gubernatorial elections
 88th United States Congress
 89th United States Congress

Notes

References